Raggs is a live-action/animated TV series for children about five dogs that form a Ragtime band called The Raggs Band. There are 195 half hour episodes and 200 original songs in multiple languages. It was originally produced in Sydney, Australia, with additional production in the United States in English and Spanish. It was broadcast in the United States on February 4, 2008 on PBS Kids. In 2014, The Raggs Band reunited to record 20 classic kids' songs.

Broadcast
Raggs began broadcasting on SABC 2 in South Africa on 7 May 2018.

"Raggs" recently aired in the US and Canada on Smile, Telemundo, and in Latin America on FETV Canal-Panama, RTV-Ecuador, Canal Dos-El Salvador, Guest Choice Cable-Dominican Republic and Corporación Televicentro-Honduras. "Raggs" YouTube channel, RaggsTV, hosts short episodes and animations to classic kids' songs.

History
Raggs was originally created in 1990 by U.S. advertising executive Toni Steedman for her 6-year-old daughter, Alison, as a series of carpool stories. Steedman later used the Raggs characters for a regional mall promotion and advertising campaign. By 2001, the successful mall programs encouraged Steedman, along with former HBO producer Carole Rosen, to create a one-hour music video-inspired pilot called "Pawsuuup," which was shot in Myrtle Beach, South Carolina, and New York City in August 2001. While Steedman shopped the pilot for a production or broadcast partner, The Raggs Band (also known as the Raggs Kids' Club Band because of the regional mall kids' clubs for which Raggs served as mascot) began playing concerts at fairs, festivals and performing arts venues.
 
In 2005, Steedman and her company, Raggs LLC, entered into a co-production relationship with Southern Star International (now Endemol Australia) to produce the Raggs series for the Seven Network in Sydney, Australia. Production began in 2005 using Alias Maya at the ABC Studios in Sydney, and the first episode of Series 1 began airing daily at 9 am on Seven in January 2006. Series 1 consisted of 65 half hours episodes. Raggs quickly garnered strong ratings and, within a few months of airing, Seven ordered Series 2, an additional 65 episodes. In 2007, Seven ordered Series 3, also 65 episodes, bringing the total to 195 original half hours by 2009. Each episode featured original Raggs’ music, written and produced in the U.S. by Concentrix Music and Sound Design, requiring over 200 original songs for the 195 half hours of shows.
 
Southern Star distributed Raggs to several countries including Singapore, Bulgaria, South Africa and India. In the U.S., Steedman worked to establish Raggs on public television. KQED San Francisco signed on as the presenting station in association with American Public Television, and Raggs began airing on public TV stations in 2007.
 
In January 2010, Steedman reacquired Southern Star’s distribution and licensing rights under Blue Socks Media LLC. Blue Sock Media LLC, completing a complete consolidation of the worldwide assets, later purchased Raggs LLC. Steedman continues to head Blue Socks Media in Charlotte, North Carolina.
 
In July 2012, Telemundo, the NBC-owned Spanish language network, licensed 120 episodes of Raggs in Spanish. Raggs aired on Telemundo Saturdays at 8 am ET and Sundays at 8 and 8:30 am ET.

The Raggs characters are used at Grand Palladium family-friendly resorts in the Caribbean and Mexico to host the kids program, "Play at Palladium with Raggs." Features include a Live Show, disco party, and character breakfast.

Palace Theatre 2004
Throughout 2004, the band starred in a 90-minute performance at The Palace Theatre in Myrtle Beach, alongside comic strip cat Garfield. The performances focused on the RAGGS Kids Club Band planning a birthday party for the famous orange cat. Suspecting things, Garfield "won't relax until he gets the surprise".

RAGGS Kids Club Band: PAWSUUUP! Tour
A DVD was released 17 August 2004, featuring in-concert performances of seven of the band's songs, and three "music videos". The 55-minute-long program was produced by Linda Mendoza (The Chris Rock Show) of Line by Line Productions, and executive produced by Carole Rosen.

The crew included screenwriter Mark Valenti (Rugrats, Hey Arnold!, Totally Spies!), lighting designer Alan Adelman (75+ episodes of Great Performances, Nickelodeon Kids' Choice Awards), music producers Fred and Becky Story (Concentrix Music & Sound), costume designer "Greyseal", and choreographer Hardin Minor (National Dance Institute).

The DVD earned 3.5 out of 4 stars from Suite 101 Family Entertainment film critic Nicholas Moreau, tied for the highest ever rating for an independently produced DVD.  The music from the tour was later released as a CD album.

Raggs Live Around the World
The Raggs Band has played more than 2,000 live performances in four continents.  In the U.S., Raggs has performed at many state fairs, basketball games, regional malls, national fundraisers such as the Jerry Lewis MDA Telethon, and parades. Overseas, the Raggs Band has performed at U.S. military bases in Japan, South Korea, Belgium, The Netherlands, Germany, and Iceland.

In Australia, the Raggs Band performed at Westfield Malls and was one of two children's acts to perform on Carols in the Domain, a nationally televised live musical show.

Episodes

Series 1 (2006–2008)

Series 2 (2008–2009)

References

External links
 
 Raggs.com.au 
 Raggs at Blue Socks Media
 
 

Seven Network original programming
English-language television shows
Animated television series about dogs
Television series by Endemol Australia
American children's animated musical television series
2006 Australian television series debuts
2008 Australian television series endings
2000s Australian animated television series
2008 American television series debuts
2009 American television series endings
American children's musical groups
2000s American animated television series
2000s American children's television series
Australian children's animated musical television series
American preschool education television series
American television series with live action and animation
American television shows featuring puppetry
Australian preschool education television series
Australian television series with live action and animation
Australian television shows featuring puppetry
PBS Kids shows
Australian children's musical groups
2000s preschool education television series